John Gerald (Jack) Masters (born John Gerald Mastrangelo; 27 September 1931) is a former Canadian politician. He served as mayor of the city of Thunder Bay, Ontario, and as a federal Member of Parliament. He was born in Fort William, Ontario.

He was elected to the House of Commons of Canada as a Liberal for the constituency of Thunder Bay—Nipigon in the 1980 federal election and served as the parliamentary secretary to the Minister of State (Mines) and the Minister of Communications in the final government of Pierre Trudeau. He was defeated in the 1984 federal election by Ernie Epp.

External links
 

1931 births
Living people
Canadian people of Italian descent
Mayors of Thunder Bay
Liberal Party of Canada MPs
Members of the House of Commons of Canada from Ontario